Allan John Joseph 'Jack' Smith (29 August 1909 – 1 July 1983) was an Australian rules footballer who played with St Kilda and North Melbourne in the Victorian Football League (VFL).

Notes

External links 

1909 births
1983 deaths
Australian rules footballers from Victoria (Australia)
St Kilda Football Club players
North Melbourne Football Club players
West Torrens Football Club players
Norwood Football Club players